The Phynx is a 1970 American comedy film directed by Lee H. Katzin about a rock and roll band named The Phynx and their mission in foreign affairs. The group is sent to Albania to locate celebrity hostages taken prisoner by Communists. Last part of the film, supposedly set in Albania, was filmed in Spanish city of Ávila, recognizable by its medieval walls.

This turned out to be the final film appearance for several of the veteran performers in the cast, including Leo Gorcey, George Tobias and Marilyn Maxwell.

History
The Phynx received an extremely limited release, and has since become something of an obscure, rarely seen cult film; bootleg copies for many years turned up on auction websites before Warner Archive officially released the film on DVD in October 2012.

Plot

Cast
The Phynx... Themselves
A. "Michael" Miller
Ray Chippeway
Dennis Larden
Lonny Stevens
Lou Antonio... Corrigan
Mike Kellin... Bogey
Michael Ansara... Col. Rostinov
George Tobias... Markevitch
Joan Blondell... Ruby
Martha Raye... Foxy
Larry Hankin... Philbaby
Pat McCormick... Father O'Hoolihan
Ultra Violet... Felice
Rich Little... Voice in Box
Susan Bernard... London Belly
Sally Struthers... World's No. 1 Fan

Cameos

Patty Andrews
Rona Barrett
Edgar Bergen and Charlie McCarthy
Busby Berkeley
James Brown
Dick Clark
Xavier Cugat
Cass Daley
Andy Devine
Fritz Feld
Leo Gorcey (in his final film role, released after his death.)
Huntz Hall
John Hart (as The Lone Ranger)
Louis Hayward
George Jessel
Ruby Keeler
Patsy Kelly
Dorothy Lamour
Guy Lombardo
Trini Lopez
Joe Louis
Marilyn Maxwell (in her final film role)
Butterfly McQueen
Pat O'Brien
Maureen O'Sullivan
Richard Pryor
Harold Sakata
Colonel Sanders
Jay Silverheels (as Tonto)
Ed Sullivan
Rudy Vallee
Clint Walker
Johnny Weissmuller

Significance
This was Gorcey and Hall's final time they appeared in a film together; the duo made dozens of films together as The Dead End Kids, East Side Kids, and The Bowery Boys from the 1930s to the 1950s.

See also
 List of American films of 1970
Top Secret! (1984)

References

External links

1970 films
1970s English-language films
Films about music and musicians
Films directed by Lee H. Katzin
Films set in Albania
Warner Bros. films
American spy comedy films
1970s spy comedy films
Cold War spy films
Films shot in the province of Ávila
1970 comedy films
1970s American films